Étienne Christophe Maignet (Ambert, Puy-de-Dôme, 9 July 1758 – Ambert, 22 October 1834) was a French lawyer, politician and deputy to the National Convention.

1758 births4q-
1834 deaths
People from Puy-de-Dôme
Représentants en mission
Deputies to the French National Convention
18th-century French lawyers